Statistics of American Soccer League II in season 1966–67.

League standings

Championship final

References

American Soccer League II (RSSSF)
American Soccer League 1967

American Soccer League (1933–1983) seasons
1965–66 in American soccer
2